Saptoyoga Purnomo (born 17 September 1998 in Purwokerto, Central Java) is an Indonesian Paralympic sprinter. He won bronze medal in the 100 metres T37 at 2020 Summer Paralympics.

References

External links
 

1998 births
Living people
Indonesian male sprinters
Paralympic athletes of Indonesia
Paralympic bronze medalists for Indonesia
Paralympic medalists in athletics (track and field)
Athletes (track and field) at the 2020 Summer Paralympics
Medalists at the 2020 Summer Paralympics
Sportspeople from Central Java
20th-century Indonesian people
21st-century Indonesian people
Medalists at the 2018 Asian Para Games